Archery at the 1999 Pan American Games was held from 04 to 8 August 1999. The events took place at a temporary site at Assiniboine Park in Winnipeg, Manitoba, Canada. Just like in the Olympics, the archery competition will be held using the recurve bow.

Medal summary

Medal table

Events

See also
Archery at the 2000 Summer Olympics

References 

P
Events at the 1999 Pan American Games
1999